The Dutch Boy 150 was an ARCA Menards Series race held at the Gateway Motorsports Park in Madison, Illinois. It was originally 125 miles, but was increased to 150 miles. It has supported NASCAR Truck Series Toyota 200 in 2001, 2004, 2005, 2006, 2007, 2018, 2019, and 2020.

Past winners

ARCA Menards Series

 2001: Race shortened due to rain
 2006: Race extended due to a Green–white–checker finish.

References

External links 
 Racing-Reference.info – World Wide Technology Raceway at Gateway

1997 establishments in Illinois
ARCA Menards Series races
Motorsport in Illinois
Recurring sporting events established in 1997
Recurring sporting events disestablished in 2020
NASCAR races at Gateway Motorsports Park